The 1981–82 UEFA Cup was won by IFK Göteborg on aggregate over Hamburger SV.

Association team allocation
A total of 64 teams from 32 UEFA member associations participate in the 1981–82 UEFA Cup. The association ranking based on the UEFA country coefficients is used to determine the number of participating teams for each association:
Associations 1—3 each have four teams qualify.
Associations 4—8 each have three teams qualify.
Associations 9–22 (except Wales) each have two teams qualify.
Associations 23–33 each have one team qualify.

Association ranking
For the 1981–82 UEFA Cup, the associations are allocated places according to their 1980 UEFA country coefficients, which takes into account their performance in European competitions from 1975–76 to 1979–80.

England 4 clubs (+1)Netherlands 3 clubs (–1)France 3 clubs (+1)Yugoslavia 2 clubs (–1)

Teams
The labels in the parentheses show how each team qualified for competition:
TH: Title holders
CW: Cup winners
CR: Cup runners-up
LC: League Cup winners
2nd, 3rd, 4th, 5th, 6th, etc.: League position
P-W: End-of-season European competition play-offs winners

First round

|}

First leg

Second leg

Valencia won 2–0 on aggregate.

Neuchâtel Xamax won 6–3 on aggregate.

2–2 on aggregate; Real Madrid won on away goals.

Aris won 8–2 on aggregate.

Dinamo București won 4–2 on aggregate.

Carl Zeiss Jena won 4–1 on aggregate.

Spartak Moscow won 6–2 on aggregate.

Dynamo Dresden won 6–2 on aggregate.

FC Winterslag won 3–2 on aggregate.

Rapid Wien won 4–2 on aggregate.

IFK Göteborg won 7–2 on aggregate.

Boavista won 5–4 on aggregate.

Southampton won 4–1 on aggregate.

Hajduk Split won 5–3 on aggregate.

Malmö FF won 5–1 on aggregate.

Internazionale won 7–2 on aggregate.

Arsenal won 3–0 on aggregate.

PSV Eindhoven won 8–2 on aggregate.

2–2 on aggregate, Sturm Graz won on away goals

Beveren won 8–0 on aggregate.

Argeș Pitești won 5–1 on aggregate.

Feyenoord won 3–1 on aggregate.

Grasshoppers won 4–1 on aggregate.

Hamburger SV won 6–4 on aggregate.

1. FC Kaiserslautern won 3–1 on aggregate.

3–3 on aggregate; Borussia Mönchengladbach won on away goals.

Lokeren won 5–3 on aggregate.

Aberdeen won 4–2 on aggregate.

Dundee United won 6–4 on aggregate.

2–2 on aggregate; Radnički Niš won on away goals.

Sporting CP won 11–0 on aggregate.

Second round

|}

First leg

Second leg

Aberdeen won 5–2 on aggregate.

Lokeren won 5–1 on aggregate.

Dundee United won 5–2 on aggregate.

Hamburger SV won 3–2 on aggregate.

1. FC Kaiserslautern won 5–2 on aggregate.

Feyenoord won 3–2 on aggregate.

2–2 on aggregate; Radnički Niš won on penalties.

Dinamo București won 4–3 on aggregate.

2–2 on aggregate; Winterslag won on away goals.

4–4 on aggregate; Hajduk Split won on away goals.

Neuchâtel Xamax won 2–0 on aggregate.

Real Madrid won 3–2 on aggregate.

2–2 on aggregate; Rapid Wien won on away goals.

IFK Göteborg won 5–4 on aggregate.

Sporting CP won 4–2 on aggregate.

Valencia won 2–1 on aggregate.

Third round

|}

First leg

Second leg

Hamburger SV won 5–4 on aggregate.

IFK Göteborg won 4–1 on aggregate.

Dundee United won 5–0 on aggregate.

1. FC Kaiserslautern won 4–2 on aggregate.

Radnički Niš won 2–1 on aggregate.

Real Madrid won 1–0 on aggregate.

Neuchâtel Xamax won 1–0 on aggregate.

Valencia won 6–5 on aggregate.

Quarter-finals

|}

First leg

Second leg

Radnički Niš won 3–2 on aggregate.

Hamburger SV won 3–2 on aggregate.

1. FC Kaiserslautern won 6–3 on aggregate.

IFK Göteborg won 4–2 on aggregate.

Semi-finals

|}

First leg

Second leg

IFK Göteborg won 3–2 on aggregate.

Hamburger SV won 6–3 on aggregate.

Final

First leg

Second leg

IFK Göteborg won 4–0 on aggregate.

Top goalscorers

References

External links
1981–82 All matches UEFA Cup – season at UEFA website
Official Site
Results at RSSSF.com
 All scorers 1981–82 UEFA Cup according to protocols UEFA
1981/82 UEFA Cup - results and line-ups (archive)

UEFA Cup seasons
2